Carl Gibson (born 23 April 1963) is an English former professional rugby league footballer who played in the 1980s and 1990s. He attended Batley Boys High School.

Playing career

Club career
Gibson started his professional career with his hometown club Batley, making his debut in April 1982 against Keighley.

During January 1986, Gibson transferred from Batley to Leeds for a fee of £50,000. Gibson set an enduring record for Leeds of 91 consecutive appearances for the club before a bout of food poisoning ended his run.

Gibson played as an substitute (replacing  John Basnett) in Leeds' 14–15 defeat by St Helens in the 1987–88 John Player Special Trophy Final during the 1987–88 season at Central Park, Wigan on 9 January 1988.

Gibson played  and scored two tries in Leeds' 33–12 victory over Castleford in the 1988 Yorkshire Cup Final during the 1988–89 season at Elland Road, Leeds on 16 October 1988.

On Boxing Day 1992, Gibson suffered a broken leg in a league match against Castleford. Gibson missed the rest of the 1992–93 season as a result of the injury, and it would turn out to be his last appearance for the club, as he was sold to Featherstone Rovers in August 1993 for a fee of £15,000.

Representative honours
Gibson won caps for Great Britain in 1985 against France (sub), in 1990 against France, Papua New Guinea (2-games), New Zealand (3-games), and Australia (3-games), and in 1991 against France.

Gibson was selected for Yorkshire County XIII while at Batley during the 1985–86 season.

References

External links
(archived by web.archive.org) When Britain defeated the Aussies

1963 births
Living people
Batley Bulldogs players
English rugby league players
Featherstone Rovers players
Great Britain national rugby league team players
Leeds Rhinos players
Rugby league centres
Rugby league fullbacks
Rugby league players from Batley
Rugby league wingers
Yorkshire rugby league team players